SDI Tools is a set of commercial software add-in tools for Microsoft Excel developed and distributed by Statistical Design Institute, LLC., a privately owned company located in Texas, United States.

SDI Tools were first developed in 2000  by Dr. George Chollar, Dr. Jesse Peplinski, and Garron Morris as several Add-Ins for Microsoft Excel to support a methodology for product development that combined elements of Design for Six Sigma and Systems Engineering

Today, SDI Tools are split into two main Microsoft Excel Add-Ins called Triptych and Apogee.

Triptych 
Triptych is a Microsoft Excel Add-in that provides support for documenting and clarifying the voice of the customer (VOC), identifying and flowing down requirements, and generating and selecting design alternatives. Triptych includes functionality for:
QFD: Captures the voice of the customer and translates it into engineering requirements using Quality Function Deployment methods.
Affinity Diagram: A Tool for sorting large number of ideas or concepts into logical groupings using the Affinity diagram method.
AHP (Importance): Prioritizes (or ranks) Items by performing pair-wise comparisons of Items against each other in terms of relative importance using a one-level Analytic Hierarchy Process.
TRIZ: Generates ideas for solving technical contradictions using the Theory of Inventive Problem Solving TRIZ.
Pugh Matrix: Qualitative multi-criteria decision analysis using Pugh Concept Selection method.
TOPSIS: Goal-based multi-criteria decision analysis using Technique for Order Preference by Similarity to Ideal Solution (TOPSIS) methodology.
SDI Matrix: Quantitative multi-criteria decision analysis developed by Statistical Design Institute using Value Assessments for product specifications.
FMEA: A risk assessment technique for systematically identifying potential failures in a system or a process using Failure mode and effects analysis.

Apogee 
Apogee is a Microsoft Excel Add-In that integrates the capabilities of sensitivity analysis, Monte Carlo analysis, allocation, and multi-objective optimization into a single easy-to-use toolset. Apogee works with functions Y = f(x) that you create freeform in Microsoft Excel workbooks. Its functionality includes:
Sensitivity Analysis:  Assesses the magnitude of response variation caused by the variation of the parameters using a Sensitivity analysis.
Monte Carlo Analysis: Assesses the magnitude and shape of response variation caused by the variation of the parameters using the Monte Carlo method.
Allocation: identifies the allowable amount of parameter variation that will improve response variation to a desired level. (Often referred to as statistical tolerance analysis or requirements flowdown.)
Optimization: searches for new parameter values that will drive multiple response values to desired targets using statistical, multi-objective optimization driven by a custom genetic algorithm.

Application of SDI Tools 
SDI Tools are typically used in Six Sigma training, industry, and academic research

See also
List of Six Sigma software packages

References

External links
 Statistical Design Institute Home page

Microsoft Office-related statistical software
Windows-only software